OLL Ltd v Secretary of State for Transport [1997] 3 All E.R. 897 is a landmark English court case concerned with negligence from the King's Bench Division of the High Court of England and Wales with particular regard to the duty of care owed by the emergency services. Her Majesty's Coastguard do not usually owe a duty of care to people who require its assistance.

Facts
In this case, His Majesty's Coastguard (HMCG) had failed to respond in an adequate period of time to emergency calls concerning a group of schoolchildren canoeing off the coast of Dorset who had encountered difficulties, three of whom later died. The canoe hire company (OLL Ltd) settled several claims with the victims and was seeking a contribution from the Secretary of State for Transport, under whose remit HMCG falls as an executive agency.

Judgement
The issue boiled down to whether the coastguard owed a duty of care to those it was aware required its assistance (other cases had held that the police and firefighters did not owe such a duty, see below). It was held that HMCG did not owe a duty of care to those requiring its assistance unless they actively made the situation worse, rather than by omission, as was the case here. As such, the claim was dismissed and the hire company were forced to foot the bill for the entirety of the compensation. However, this case did not reach the appeals courts: the Court of Appeal of England and Wales and the House of Lords and so this rule could easily change, should a further, similar case, reach the higher courts.

See also
 Kent v Griffiths (Opposite rule for the ambulance service)
 Capital and Counties plc v Hampshire County Council (Fire Brigade)
 Alexandrou v Oxford (Police)
 Hill v Chief Constable of West Yorkshire Police (Similar to above, regarding criminal investigations)
 Negligence
 Duty of care
 Vicarious liability
 Donoghue v Stevenson
 Smith v. Leech Brain & Co

References

English tort case law
High Court of Justice cases
1997 in case law
1997 in British law
Department for Transport